Allison M. Brock (born 7 December 1979) is an American equestrian. She represented her country at the 2016 Summer Olympics, winning a bronze medal in team dressage.

References

External links
 

1979 births
Living people
Sportspeople from Honolulu
American female equestrians
American dressage riders
Equestrians at the 2016 Summer Olympics
Medalists at the 2016 Summer Olympics
Olympic bronze medalists for the United States in equestrian
21st-century American women